Mount Hope is a granite outcrop located to the north of Pyramid Hill in northern Victoria, Australia. The outcrop lies within the 126 hectare Mount Hope Nature Conservation Reserve which is managed by Parks Victoria.

The reserve has limited facilities, including picnic tables and an unsealed parking area at the foot of the outcrop which is accessed from the unsealed Old Leitchville Road. Activities include rock climbing and bird observing.

Communications facilities for Ambulance Victoria, Goulburn Murray Water and the Department of Sustainability and Environment are located near the mountain summit.

History
In 1836 Scottish-born explorer Thomas Livingstone Mitchell became the first European to sight the mountain. He ascended it on June 28 after having sighted it four days earlier from the north-west and commented:

On the summit he discovered two new plant species,  Philotheca pungens and Hibbertia incana. He observed in the distance what is now known as Pyramid Hill:

Mitchell changed his course, having observed promising country from its summit:

The mountain was climbed again in 1838 by Joseph Hawdon who was droving cattle between Howlong in New South Wales and Adelaide in South Australia. Hawdon observed:

The small kangaroo was an eastern hare-wallaby, a species that became extinct a few years after the arrival of the first European settlers.

In 1845 Mount Hope Station was established. The station originally covered 77,000 acres and had 100,000 sheep.

In 1857 unsubstantiated rumours led to a gold rush to the area, but no gold was ever found.

On 1 September 1860, members of the Burke and Wills expedition ascended the summit, including  Ludwig Becker, a naturalist, geologist and artist. In his first report to the Royal Society of Victoria, Becker commented:

Becker made a watercolour sketch depicting the view to Pyramid Hill from the summit. The hill shown to the left is now a gravel quarry.

In 1898 the body of farm labourer was discovered at the foot of a 100-foot high boulder by children during a school picnic. Although there was no evidence to determine whether the death was accidental or not, the location subsequently became known as Suicide Rock.

Quarry
Stone from a quarry operated by Ole Roald at Mount Hope was used to construct roads in the Cohuna, Boort and Kerang districts after World War II. The quarry was purchased by Mawsons in 1952 and used for gravel and stone. The stone was found to be of inferior quality and the site lacked electricity need to operate power crushers and screens. The quarry was closed in 1958, with equipment moved to another quarry at Lake Boga.

References

Rock formations of Victoria (Australia)